Malans is the name of the following municipalities:

 Malans, Doubs, a commune in the Doubs department in France
 Malans, Haute-Saône, a commune in the Haute-Saône department in France
 Malans, Switzerland, a municipality in the Swiss canton of Graubünden
 Malans railway station, a Rhaetian Railway station

Other
 Malans (grape), a Swiss wine grape also known as Completer